Wild, Wild Planet is a 1966 Italian science fiction film directed by Anthony Dawson and written by Renato Moretti and Ivan Reiner. Tony Russel stars as Commander Mike Halstead.

Plot
In 2015, Commander Mike Halstead, commander of space station Gamma One of the United Democracies Space Command, is assigned to investigate the alarming number of missing person reports on Earth.

Dr. Nurmi is engaged in secret bio-engineering experiments on the same base as Halstead, which causes an issue for Halstead, who disapproves of the experiments. While Nurmi's assignment is to study miniaturization of human organs, he starts kidnapping influential world leaders for use in his eugenics program. Nurmi is actually working for the planet Delphos, using four armed androids to assist in the kidnapping and is transporting the miniaturized world leader to Delphos.

Halstead confronts Nurmi over his suspicions of illegal experiments but is confined to quarters by his superiors. Lieutenants Jake and Ken free him.

Nurmi seduces Halstead's girlfriend, Lieutenant Connie Gomez. Nurmi wants to use Gomez in his experiments to build a genetically perfect, immortal race of humans. Halstead comes to the rescue in outer space.

Cast
 Tony Russel as Cmdr. Mike Halstead (as Tony Russell)
 Lisa Gastoni as Lt. Connie Gomez (as Jane Fate)
 Massimo Serato as Mr. Nurmi
 Carlo Giustini as Lt. Ken (as Charles Justin)
 Franco Nero as Lt. Jake Jacowitz
 Enzo Fiermonte as General Paul H. Fowler
 Umberto Raho as 	Umberto Raho	...	General Maitland (as Bert Raho)
 Vittorio Bonos as Delfos Scientist (as Victor Bonos)
 Aldo Canti as Gymnasium Victim (as Aldo Kant)

Production
The English translation of the original title was The Galaxy Criminals, but it was changed for release in the United States in hopes of capitalizing on the then-popular TV show The Wild Wild West.

The film is the first of four "Gamma One" science fiction films.  The films were originally contracted by Metro-Goldwyn-Mayer to be made-for-TV movies, but were released theatrically instead in some countries. The films were shot consecutively, often reusing the same sets and actors

Reception
Moria found the movie to have a fun, schlocky plot and a colorful bizarreness, but found the direction lacking and the movie ultimately dull. TV Guide found the movie fun but the acting wooden. Creature Feature gave the movie one star, finding it dull. Turner Classic Movies found the campy movie fun, with much of the dialogue and special effects unintentionally funny.

The Encyclopedia of Science Fiction found the premise and set up to be interesting, but that the movie fails to live up to its promise. It further found the space sequences good, but the Earth-bound portion of the story dull and the plans and motivations of Nurmi absurd.

The Buffalo Courier-Express found the film "a wilder than a wild stretch of the imagination, and a poor one at that.... Aside from some interesting backgrounds and props, it hasn't much to offer except to the staunchest of science-fiction fans. A confused plot involves the rivalry between world and planetary governments."

Release
Wild, Wild Planet was released in Italy in 1966, where it was distributed by Titanus. It opened in New York on August 9, 1967. As of January 2021, the movie is available to rent from many services, including Amazon and YouTube. It was released on DVD in 2010.

See also
 List of films featuring miniature people

References

External links
 
 
 
 Rotten Tomatoes listing
 Badmovies.org Review
 

1960s science fiction films
1966 films
Films about astronauts
Films directed by Antonio Margheriti
1960s Italian-language films
Italian science fiction films
Metro-Goldwyn-Mayer films
Films scored by Angelo Francesco Lavagnino
1960s Italian films